The 2023 CAF Super Cup, known as the TotalEnergies CAF Super Cup 2023 for sponsorship reasons, will be the 32nd CAF Super Cup, an annual football match in Africa organized by the Confederation of African Football (CAF), between the winners of the previous season's two CAF club competitions, the CAF Champions League and the CAF Confederation Cup.

The match will be played between the 2022–23 CAF Champions League winners, and the 2022–23 CAF Confederation Cup winners.

Teams

Format
The CAF Super Cup is played as a single match at a neutral venue, with the CAF Champions League winners designated as the "home" team for administrative purposes. If the score is tied at the end of regulation, extra time will not be played, and the penalty shoot-out will be used to determine the winner (CAF Champions League Regulations XXVII and CAF Confederation Cup Regulations XXV).

Match

References

External links
CAFonline.com

2022-23
Super Cup